Discoserra is a prehistoric ray-finned fish from the Mississippian of Montana, a member of the Guildayichthyiformes, with a round body and a skull possessing primitive and modern traits. Discoserra is about 60 mm long. In 2006, Discoserra was hypothesized to be a stem neopterygian, although it has alternatively been placed in Cladistia along with other Guildayichthyiformes.

References

Mississippian fish of North America
Guildayichthyiformes